is a railway station on the Yokkaichi Asunarou Railway Utsube Line in Yokkaichi, Mie Prefecture, Japan, operated by the private railway operator Yokkaichi Asunarou Railway. It is 1.0 rail kilometers from the terminus of the Utsube Line at Asunarou Yokkaichi Station.

Lines
Yokkaichi Asunarou Railway
Utsube Line

Layout
Akahori Station has a single side platform serving bi-directional traffic. The station is unattended.

Platforms

Adjacent stations

History
Akahori Station was opened on October 10, 1912, as a station on the Mie Tramway Line, which became the Mie Railway in 1916. On February 11, 1944, due to mergers, the station came under the ownership of Sanco. In November 1944, the station was rebuilt 100 meters closer towards present-day Asunarou Yokkaichi Station. On February 1, 1964, the Railway division of Sanco split off and formed a separate company, the Mie Electric Railway, which merged with Kintetsu on April 1, 1965.

The line has been operated by the Yokkaichi Asunarou Railway since April 1, 2015.

References

External links

Railway stations in Japan opened in 1912
Railway stations in Mie Prefecture